Barretthydrus is a genus of beetles in the family Dytiscidae, containing the following species:

 Barretthydrus geminatus Lea, 1927
 Barretthydrus stepheni Watts, 1978
 Barretthydrus tibialis Lea, 1927

References

Dytiscidae genera